Pyrgota valida is a species of fly in the family Pyrgotidae.

References

Further reading

External links

 

Pyrgotidae
Insects described in 1841